Leonardo Felice Gorordo is an American entrepreneur, investor and advisor, currently serving as CEO of eMerge Americas. He is best known for his work on Cuba–United States relations through advocacy and public service. Gorordo previously served in the White House under Presidents Barack Obama and George W. Bush, and as an advisor to President Joe Biden's Cancer Initiative.

Early life and education

Gorordo was born and raised in Miami, FL, to a Cuban-American family and attended Belen Jesuit Preparatory School. From 2000 to 2001, he served as International Vice-President of Key Club International, an international service program for high school students in 38 countries. Gorordo attended Georgetown University and graduated with a bachelor's degree in government in 2005. He also studied at the Complutense University of Madrid in Spain. While in college, he was an intern in the White House Office of Political Affairs during the Administration of President George W. Bush. As a sophomore at Georgetown University, Gorordo co-founded (with a group of college students) Roots of Hope (Raíces de Esperanza), a non-profit focused on youth empowerment in Cuba through technology and entrepreneurship.

Public service
Upon graduating from college, Gorordo served in the Administration of President George W. Bush as an aide to the U.S. Secretary of Commerce Carlos Gutierrez, and later as Special Assistant to the Director of the U.S. Citizenship & Immigration Services Col. Emilio T. Gonzalez. From 2006 to 2007, Gorordo was detailed to the U.S. Department of State and served in the Bureau of Western Hemisphere Affairs. He also served as an advisor to the President & CEO of Jackson Health System. In 2011, Gorordo was appointed by President Barack Obama as one of fifteen White House Fellows. From 2011 to 2012, he served as the White House Fellow to the President’s Domestic Policy Advisor Cecilia Muñoz, and worked in the White House Office of Public Engagement and Intergovernmental Affairs. In this capacity, he worked on Latino and immigration outreach and led the organizing of the first “White House Conference on Connecting the Americas. ” The conference included the participation of then-U.S. Secretary of State Hillary Clinton, several cabinet secretaries and high-level business and government leaders from throughout the Americas in lead up to the 2012 Summit of the Americas.

In 2021, Gorordo advocated for the passage of the Infrastructure Investment and Jobs Act (IIJA) and attended the White House bill signing ceremony with President Joe Biden. America Magazine reported that Gorordo was under consideration to be appointed U.S. Ambassador to the Holy See by President Biden.

As CEO of eMerge Americas, Gorordo has been instrumental in connecting Florida’s major tech hubs of Miami, Tampa and Orlando in 2021 to work on a more open business environment for startup ecosystem building. In April 2022, in collaboration with the U.S. Conference of Mayors, Gorordo helped to organize a conference for mayors and private sector leaders to discuss the ways cities can benefit from digital assets and blockchain technologies.

Entrepreneurship
Following the White House Fellowship, Gorordo joined Clearpath, (acquired by L1BRE), a venture-backed tech company focused on revolutionizing the paper-based immigration filing process – just as TurboTax transformed tax filing. In 2014, he became CEO & President of Clearpath, which leveraged patented-technology to enable individuals to file their own immigration applications. He established partnerships with LegalZoom, H&R Block, and Univision, and successfully sold the company in 2016 to L1BRE. After the acquisition of Clearpath, Gorordo served as CEO of L1BRE, a tech company with operations in the U.S. and Mexico. In 2018, Gorordo was named CEO of eMerge Americas, a venture-backed platform which seeks to foster innovation and entrepreneurship across the Americas, and transform Miami into becoming the tech hub of the Americas. In 2019, he led the organizing of the sixth annual eMerge Americas conference, which attracted more than 16,000 attendees and 400 participating companies from over 40 countries.  Gorordo also served as co-host for AOL co-founder and Revolution LLC's CEO & Chairman Steve Case’s “Rise of the Rest” Tour through South Florida in 2019.
 
He currently serves as a venture partner at private equity fund I Squared Capital.

Advocacy

U.S.- Cuba relations
In 2003, Gorordo co-founded Roots of Hope after traveling to Cuba for the first time with the purpose of building bridges between young people on and off the island. He built and led a network with over 5,000 students and young professional members across 50 universities in the U.S. He also organized 10 youth leadership conferences at leading universities, including Harvard, Georgetown, Princeton, and Cornell. In 2009, Gorordo served as an advisor to Grammy winner Juanes and helped organize the historic "Peace without Borders" (Paz Sin Fronteras) concert in Havana, Cuba, with 1.2 million young people in attendance. Gorordo contributed to the re-establishment of U.S.-Cuba diplomatic ties, and accompanied then-U.S. Secretary of State John Kerry to the re-opening of the Embassy of the United States, Havana in 2015, and President Barack Obama on his historic trip to Cuba in 2016 (the first sitting U.S. president to travel to the island since President Calvin Coolidge in 1928). Following the peaceful protests in Cuba inspired by the song Patria y Vida on July 11, 2021, Gorordo, alongside a diverse group of Cuban-American community activists, was invited for the meeting with President Joe Biden to discuss the current political situation in Cuba and how to support the Cuban people to bypass the censorship and get access to free media and internet.

Cancer Moonshot
In 2015, Gorordo and his mother participated in the pilgrimage trip to Cuba with Pope Francis, which led to her being blessed by the Pope and reuniting with her family on the island after 46 years. After losing his mother to pancreatic cancer, Gorordo became involved with then-Vice President Joe Biden’s “moonshot to cure cancer.” In 2016, he helped in the organizing of the White House Cancer Moonshot Summits. In 2018, Gorordo joined the Biden Cancer Initiative and led the organizing of more than 450 Biden Cancer Community Summits across the U.S. to focus national attention on creating actionable solutions in the fight against cancer. In 2018, Gorordo also served as an Entrepreneur-In-Residence at StartUp Health, a venture fund and accelerator investing in “Health Moonshots” – like curing cancer – and building a portfolio of digital health companies in over 20 countries.

Affiliations
Gorordo has appeared as a guest commentator on CNN, BBC, NPR, MSNBC, NBC Nightly News,  Univision, and Telemundo. His views and articles have also been published in Forbes, Newsweek, The Economist, The Hill, The New Yorker, The Wall Street Journal and The Washington Post. He previously served as Senior Fellow at the Georgetown University Beeck Center on Social Impact and Innovation. Felice was selected to serve as a delegate for the 2020 Democratic National Convention. He also served as National Co-Chair for Catholics for Biden and member of the Biden for President National Finance Committee.
Felice serves as a Lifetime Member of the Council on Foreign Relations and serves on the Democratic National Committee's National Finance Committee, Latino Victory Fund National Committee, and the boards of the American Business Immigration Coalition, the Immigration Partnership and Coalition Fund and Baptist Health Foundation.

Personal life
Gorordo is married to Bianca Ferrer and has two children, Catalina and David. The Gorordos live in Miami, Florida.

External links
 eMerge Americas
 
Raices de Esperanza
 
Biden Cancer Initiative

References
 

 

 
White House Fellows
 
American technology chief executives
 
Georgetown University alumni
 
1982 births
 
Living people